Pramila Pandey is an Indian politician from the state of Uttar Pradesh. She is the mayor of Kanpur Municipal Corporation. She won by over 1.05 Lakhs votes to her nearest Indian National Congress rival Vandana Mishra.

She was the vice-president of the BJP before becoming a mayor.

References

External links

 Profile on National Election Watch

1956 births
Living people
Bharatiya Janata Party politicians from Uttar Pradesh
Mayors of Kanpur
Uttar Pradesh municipal councillors
People from Kanpur
Women mayors of places in Uttar Pradesh